Glyphodes expansialis is a moth in the family Crambidae. It was described by Strand in 1912. It is found in Cameroon.

References

Moths described in 1912
Glyphodes